The Skwawkbox is a left-wing news site based in the United Kingdom, founded in 2012 by Steve Walker.

Aims
The Skwawkbox states that its aim is to "present information and analysis that will rarely make it into the mainstream media." Founder Steve Walker has said: "The people we're trying to reach are what we call the outer parts of the Venn diagram. Not the real dedicated people on the left, but maybe their auntie or their uncle who reads their Facebook page."

Content
According to BuzzFeed, The Skwawkbox has published a "regular run of stories that appear to have been briefed by insiders close to the top of the Corbyn project", suggesting that certain senior individuals in the Labour Party use it to get their messages out. It has been involved in rallying online support for pro-Corbyn hashtags on Twitter and emailing and petitioning MPs within the Labour Party.

The Skwawkbox has had genuine scoops. For example in June 2019 it reported that Luciana Berger was set to join the Liberal Democrats and would stand for election in Finchley and Golders Green in the next parliamentary election. The story was dismissed by Jewish Chronicle journalist Lee Harpin among others, but proved to be well-founded.

In common with other left-wing alternative media sites, The Skwawkbox'''s stance towards the Labour leadership became more critical after Corbyn stepped down and Keir Starmer was elected as Labour leader in 2020.

Grenfell Tower fire
In June 2017, The Skwawkbox published an article suggesting that the real death toll from the Grenfell Tower fire was being covered up, based on claims from "multiple sources" that the government had placed a D-Notice on coverage. A correction was published later. 

There was no such notice, which led MailOnline and The Sun in turn to publish articles accusing the site of spreading "fake news". Walker complained about the MailOnline article to the Independent Press Standards Organisation. IPSO concluded that the MailOnline characterisations of the D-Notice story as "fake news" and of allegations against Theresa May in the article as "false" were not misleading and the complaint was not upheld. See 16690-17 Walker v Mail Online. 

The MailOnline D-Notice story referred to Steve Walker's business dealings with the NHS. This aspect was also covered by The Sun. Both outlets published corrections to their accounts of these dealings. The IPSO ruling noted that MailOnine had offered to append the following footnote, with a similar wording to be published as a standalone correction:

Libel case
In November 2019, Labour MP Anna Turley sued Unite the Union and Steve Walker, editor of The Skwawkbox, for libel in respect of an article which appeared on The Skwawkbox on 7 April 2017.

On 19 December 2019, following a six-day trial at the Royal Courts of Justice, Turley won the libel claim against Unite and Walker and was awarded damages of £75,000.

An application to appeal was filed, but refused on 7 May 2020.

RegulationThe Skwawkbox subscribes to independent, Leveson-compliant press regulator IMPRESS. In March 2018, Skwawkbox considered cutting ties with IMPRESS following the publication of a controversial 1961 political pamphlet by key IMPRESS supporter Max Mosley; however, it has remained a member. According to the regulator's 2017/18 annual report, it upheld three complaints against The Skwawkbox in the year up to 31 March 2018, the most of any member over the period. The same number of complaints were dismissed.

In November 2018, IMPRESS ruled against The Skwawkbox for breaching standards in its reporting on Labour MP Wes Streeting. The complaint upheld was that the publishers did not take all reasonable steps to ensure accuracy, because Streeting had only been given four hours to respond to the blog's enquiry. The panel did not make a judgment on the factual accuracy of the article.

In August 2019, NewsGuard gave Skwawkbox a green approval mark with a pass on all relevant criteria, saying that Skwawkbox "generally maintains basic standards of credibility and transparency" and commenting that "[a]rticles on The Skwawkbox, while agenda-driven, are typically fact-based and well-sourced, citing interviews or official statements from political leaders and activists, primary documents such as government reports, and subject matter experts. Links to supporting documents, social media posts, and other sources are often embedded in articles. Headlines accurately reflect content.". In June 2020, NewsGuard reviewed its rating of Skwawkbox and again awarded a perfect score for transparency and credibility, of 100/100.

See also
Another Angry Voice
The Canary (website)
Evolve PoliticsThe London Economic''

References 

British political websites
Internet properties established in 2009
2009 establishments in the United Kingdom
Left-wing politics in the United Kingdom
Alternative journalism organizations